Elmridge (also known as Elm Ridge, or James Gardiner Coffin House, or J.G. Coffin House or John Walker House) located at 1 Breck Drive in Leetsdale, Pennsylvania, was built in 1869.  The architectural plans were published in Hobbs Architecture, 1873.  The house was added to the National Register of Historic Places on May 10, 2005, and to the List of Pittsburgh History and Landmarks Foundation Historic Landmarks in 2007.

References

Houses on the National Register of Historic Places in Pennsylvania
Houses in Allegheny County, Pennsylvania
Houses completed in 1869
Italianate architecture in Pennsylvania
Pittsburgh History & Landmarks Foundation Historic Landmarks
1869 establishments in Pennsylvania
National Register of Historic Places in Allegheny County, Pennsylvania